Lists of Sahitya Akademi Award winners cover winners of the Sahitya Akademi Award, a literary honor in India which Sahitya Akademi, India's National Academy of Letters, annually confers on writers of outstanding works in one of the twenty-four major Indian languages.
The lists are organized by language.

List of Sahitya Akademi Award winners for Assamese
List of Sahitya Akademi Award winners for Bengali
List of Sahitya Akademi Award winners for Bodo
List of Sahitya Akademi Award winners for Dogri
List of Sahitya Akademi Award winners for English
List of Sahitya Akademi Award winners for Gujarati
List of Sahitya Akademi Award winners for Hindi
List of Sahitya Akademi Award winners for Kannada
List of Sahitya Akademi Award winners for Kashmiri
List of Sahitya Akademi Award winners for Konkani
List of Sahitya Akademi Award winners for Maithili
List of Sahitya Akademi Award winners for Malayalam
List of Sahitya Akademi Award winners for Meitei
List of Sahitya Akademi Award winners for Marathi
List of Sahitya Akademi Award winners for Nepali 
List of Sahitya Akademi Award winners for Odia
List of Sahitya Akademi Award winners for Punjabi
List of Sahitya Akademi Award winners for Rajasthani
List of Sahitya Akademi Award winners for Sanskrit
List of Sahitya Akademi Award winners for Santali
List of Sahitya Akademi Award winners for Sindhi
List of Sahitya Akademi Award winners for Tamil
List of Sahitya Akademi Award winners for Telugu
List of Sahitya Akademi Award winners for Urdu

References

 
Sahitya Akademi

Sahitya Akademi